WMOK Metropolis AM is a radio station broadcasting a country music format - airing on 920AM and 93.7FM. Licensed to Metropolis, Illinois, the station serves Southern Illinois, and the Paducah, Kentucky area. WMOK is owned by Withers Broadcasting, which purchased the station in 1997.

History
The station began broadcasting on February 4, 1951, and originally ran 500 watts during daytime hours only. The station's power was increased to 1,000 watts in 1954. By 1989, the station had added nighttime operations, running 73 watts. In 2008, the station's nighttime power was increased to 750 watts. The station has long aired a country music format.

References

External links
WMOK's website
Withers Broadcasting Website

MOK
Country radio stations in the United States
Companies based in Massac County, Illinois
Radio stations established in 1951
1951 establishments in Illinois